Samuel de Araújo Miranda (born 28 March 1988, in Governador Valadares, Brazil), known as Samuel Araújo, is a Brazilian professional football who plays for Isa Town club.

External links
 
 
 

1988 births
Living people
People from Governador Valadares
Brazilian footballers
Ituano FC players
Oeste Futebol Clube players
Agremiação Sportiva Arapiraquense players
C.D. Mafra players
S.C. Covilhã players
FC Zimbru Chișinău players
Zawisza Bydgoszcz players
Ethnikos Achna FC players
Ekstraklasa players
Cypriot First Division players
Association football defenders
Brazilian expatriate footballers
Expatriate footballers in Moldova
Expatriate footballers in Portugal
Expatriate footballers in Poland
Expatriate footballers in Qatar
Expatriate footballers in Cyprus
Brazilian expatriate sportspeople in Moldova
Brazilian expatriate sportspeople in Portugal
Brazilian expatriate sportspeople in Poland
Brazilian expatriate sportspeople in Qatar
Brazilian expatriate sportspeople in Cyprus
Sportspeople from Minas Gerais